La Grange is a historic home located at La Plata, Charles County, Maryland, United States. It is a house built in the Georgian neoclassic style, and was the home of Dr. James Craik from 1765 to 1783.

La Grange was listed on the National Register of Historic Places in 1976.

References

External links
, including photo from 1969, at Maryland Historical Trust

Houses on the National Register of Historic Places in Maryland
Houses in Charles County, Maryland
Georgian architecture in Maryland
National Register of Historic Places in Charles County, Maryland